Failures for Gods is the third album by American death metal band Immolation. It was released on Metal Blade Records in 1999.

Track listing
All songs written by Immolation.

Personnel
Immolation
Ross Dolan – bass, vocals
Alex Hernandez – drums
Robert Vigna – lead and rhythm guitars
Thomas Wilkinson – lead and rhythm guitars

Production
Brian Ames – design, layout
Andreas Marschall – cover art
Paul Orofino – engineering, producer
Brad Vance – mastering
John Vigna – back cover graphics, icon enhancements
Jeff Wolfe – photography

References

1999 albums
Immolation (band) albums
Metal Blade Records albums